The women's 4 × 400 metres relay event  at the 1993 IAAF World Indoor Championships was held on 13 March.

Results

Russia originally won the gold in 3:28.90 but was later disqualified for doping by Marina Shmonina.

References

Official results

Relay
4 × 400 metres relay at the World Athletics Indoor Championships
1993 in women's athletics